, also known as the Smog Monster, is a kaiju monster who first appeared in Toho's 1971 film Godzilla vs. Hedorah.

Overview
Whereas Godzilla was a symbol of Japanese concerns over nuclear weapons, Hedorah was envisioned as an embodiment of Yokkaichi asthma, caused by Japan's widespread smog and urban pollution at the time. Director Yoshimitsu Banno stated in an interview that his intention in creating Hedorah was to give Godzilla an adversary who was more than just a "giant lobster" and which represented "the most notorious thing in current society". He also stated that Hedorah's vertically tilted eyes were based on vaginas, which he joked were "scary". The monster was originally going to be named "Hedoron", though this changed once the TV series Spectreman introduced a character with an identical name.

The monster was realized via various props and a large sponge rubber suit donned by future Godzilla performer Kenpachiro Satsuma in his first acting role for Toho. Satsuma had been selected on account of his physical fitness, though he stated later that he had been disappointed to receive the role, as he had grown tired of taking non-speaking roles. In performing as Hedorah, Satsuma tried to emphasize Hedorah's otherworldly nature by making its movements seem more grotesque than animal-like. Several authors have noted that, unlike most Toho monsters, Hedorah's violent acts are graphically shown to claim human victims, and the creature shows genuine amusement at Godzilla's suffering. Banno wished to bring back Hedorah in a sequel set in Africa, but the project never materialized, as he was fired by Teruyoshi Nakano, who accused him of ruining the Godzilla series. Complex listed the character as #8 on its "The 15 Most Badass Kaiju Monsters of All Time" list.

Banno had hoped to resurrect Hedorah in his unrealized project Godzilla 3-D, which would have had the monster renamed "Deathla". Like its predecessor, Deathla would have been a shape-shifting extraterrestrial, though it would have fed on chlorophyll rather than gas emissions, and all of its forms would have incorporated a skull motif.

In Godzilla vs. Hedorah, Hedorah originates from the Dark Gas Nebula in the Orion constellation, journeys to Earth via a passing comet, and lands in Suruga Bay as a monstrous tadpole, increasing in size as it feeds on the pollutants contaminating the water. It proceeds to rampage throughout Japan, killing thousands and feeding on gas emissions and toxic waste, gradually gaining power as it advances from a water stage, to a land stage, and finally a bipedal Perfect Form that it can switch out for a smaller, flying form at any time. Godzilla confronts Hedorah, but discovers that his atomic ray has no effect on the creature. It is later discovered that Hedorah is vulnerable to temperatures high enough to dehydrate it, so the JSDF constructs a pair of gigantic electrodes on Mount Fuji. Hedorah fights Godzilla there, and is subsequently killed when Godzilla uses his atomic breath to power the electrodes, which cripple Hedorah and allow Godzilla to incinerate its remains.

Hedorah briefly reappears in Godzilla: Final Wars, where it is under the control of the Xiliens. It is swiftly destroyed alongside Ebirah in Tokyo Bay by Godzilla. A 2021 short film created for the 50th Anniversary of the character would give the Final Wars incarnations of Hedorah and Godzilla a rematch amid an oil refinery in the daytime.

Hedorah also appears in Godzilla: Monster Apocalypse, the prequel novel to Godzilla: Planet of the Monsters.

Appearances

Films
 Godzilla vs. Hedorah (1971)
 Godzilla: Final Wars (2004)
 Godzilla: Monster Planet (2017) - Mentioned in the prologue. In this film, Hedorah is a bio-weapon created by the Chinese government.

Television
 Godzilla Island (1997-1998) - The show featured Hedorah in several episodes, along with a related, but otherwise original character named Neo-Hedorah.
 Godziban (2019-present) - The children's puppet web-show features a grandfather-grandson pair of Hedorah named Hedoji and Hedochi.

Video games
 Godzilla: Monster of Monsters (NES - 1988) - Hedorah appears as a villain in the game.
 Godzilla / Godzilla-Kun: Kaijuu Daikessen (Game Boy - 1990) - Hedorah was an enemy in the game, in which it, along with King Ghidorah, was the only monster unaffected by Godzilla's blows.
 Godzilla 2: War of the Monsters (NES - 1991) - Hedorah appears as a villain in the game.
 Kaijū-ō Godzilla / King of the Monsters, Godzilla (Game Boy - 1993)
 Godzilla: Battle Legends (Turbo Duo - 1993)
 Godzilla Trading Battle (PlayStation - 1998) - As Final Form Hedorah and Flying Stage Hedorah.
 Godzilla: Destroy All Monsters Melee (GCN, Xbox - 2002/2003)
 Godzilla Unleashed: Double Smash (NDS - 2007) - Hedorah appears as a boss in this game.
 Godzilla: The Game (PS3 - 2014 PS3 PS4 - 2015)
 Godzilla Defense Force (2019)

Literature
 Godzilla vs. Gigan and the Smog Monster (1996)
 Godzilla at World’s End (1998)

Comics
 Godzilla: Legends (comic - 2011-2012)
 Godzilla: Ongoing (comic - 2012)
 Godzilla: The Half-Century War (comic - 2012-2013)
 Godzilla: Rulers of Earth (comic - 2013-2015)
 Godzilla Rivals (comic - 2021)

Music
 Hedorah appears on the album cover of Frank Zappa's Sleep Dirt.
 Hedorah appears on the album cover of Dinosaur Jr's Sweep It Into Space.

References

Bibliography
 

Extraterrestrial supervillains
Fictional characters with superhuman strength
Fictional amorphous creatures
Godzilla characters
Fictional mass murderers
Fictional monsters
Fictional parasites and parasitoids
Fictional superorganisms
Toho monsters
Science fiction film characters
Fantasy film characters
Film characters introduced in 1971
Kaiju
Horror film villains